Ethnopolitics, formerly known as Global Review of Ethnopolitics, is a peer-reviewed academic journal focusing on the intersection of ethnic groups and politics. It was established in the United Kingdom by the Political Studies Association's Specialist Group on Ethnopolitics. Its editor-in-chief is Stefan Wolff.

Ethnopolitics is now published in collaboration with the Association for the Study of Nationalities.

External links 
 

Ethnicity in politics
Ethnic studies journals
Political science journals
Taylor & Francis academic journals
Publications established in 2001
Quarterly journals
English-language journals